The Scotland A national rugby league team nicknamed the Bravehearts is made up of amateur players, who either play in the Rugby League Conference the BUCS university league or the Scottish domestic competition. Napier University has also played a huge part in the team, with many Napier students having played in the side over the years. The team regularly compete against England, Wales and Ireland, playing them annually in the Amateur Four Nations. Since the creation of this tournament, in 2002, Scotland have won it just once in 2010. In 2003 Scotland embarked on a mini tour of Europe playing in Netherlands, Italy and Serbia, helping expand rugby league in those countries by playing domestic and national sides. Former player and winner in 2010 Mike Wallace currently coaches the side.

Squad

The following squad was picked for the 2014 Celtic Nations tournament.

Results

See also 
 Scotland national rugby league team match results
 List of Scotland national rugby league team players
 Amateur Four Nations

References 
 
 A results

Rugby league in Scotland
Scotland national rugby league team
Amateur rugby league
British rugby league lists
National rugby league second teams